The Hudson County Schools of Technology is a public school district based in North Bergen that offers career and vocational education for public middle school and high school students in sixth through twelfth grades, and for adult students throughout Hudson County, New Jersey, United States.

As of the 2018–19 school year, the district, comprising six schools, had an enrollment of 2,468 students and 210.6 classroom teachers (on an FTE basis), for a student–teacher ratio of 11.7:1.

Awards and recognition
In September 2013, High Tech High School was one of 15 in New Jersey to be recognized by the United States Department of Education as part of the National Blue Ribbon Schools Program, an award described by the superintendent of the Bergen County Technical Schools as the "most prestigious honor in the United States' education system". Education Secretary Arne Duncan described these schools as schools that "represent examples of educational excellence".

County Prep High School was one of nine schools in New Jersey honored in 2020 by the National Blue Ribbon Schools Program, which recognizes high student achievement.

High Tech High School was named as a "Star School" by the New Jersey Department of Education, the highest honor that a New Jersey school can achieve, in the 1994–95 school year.

Schools

Programs administered by the Hudson County Schools of Technology (with 2018–19 enrollment data from the National Center for Education Statistics) include:
Middle school
Explore Middle School located in Jersey City (148 students; grades 6–8)
High schools
County Prep High School located in Jersey City (945 students; grades 9–12)
High Tech High School located in Secaucus, New Jersey (1,171 students; grades 9–12)
Academy of Technology Design located in Jersey City (173 students; in grades 9-12)
Barbara Mendolla, Principal
Jay Andriani, Assistant Principal
Bayonne Academy located in North Bergen (NA; grades 9-12)
KAS Prep - Knowledge Advanced Skills in Secaucus (31 students; grades 9-12)
Dr. Joseph Giammarella, Principal
Allyson Krone, Assistant Principal
Michael Ra, Assistant Principal

Administration
Core members of the district's administration are:
Amy Lin-Rodriguez, Superintendent
Nicholas Fargo, Business Administrator / Board Secretary

Board of education
The district's board of education, with nine members, sets policy and oversees the fiscal and educational operation of the district through its administration. As a Type I school district, the board's trustees are appointed to serve three-year terms of office on a staggered basis, with three seats up for appointment each year. The board appoints a superintendent to oversee the day-to-day operation of the district.

References

External links
Hudson County Schools of Technology

School Data for the Hudson County Schools of Technology, National Center for Education Statistics

North Bergen, New Jersey
School districts in Hudson County, New Jersey
Vocational school districts in New Jersey